George Waring is the name of:

George Waring (actor) (1925–2010), British actor
George D. Waring (1819–1893), American politician
George E. Waring Jr. (1833–1898), American sanitary engineer and civic reformer
George Waring (footballer) (born 1994), English footballer